Theatre Puget Sound (TPS) is a not-for-profit organization devoted to supporting the performing arts in the Puget Sound area of Washington. It was founded in 1997.

Both individuals and organizations can be members of Theatre Puget Sound. Currently, there are over 1500 individual members and over 140 organizations, including large regional theatres such as Seattle Repertory Theatre, Seattle Children's Theatre, Intiman Playhouse, 5th Avenue, and ACT Theatre, as well as small professional companies and community theatres throughout the region.

Programs of Theatre Puget Sound

Audition listings 
TPS connects talent with organizations by providing theatre, film and video audition notices to members via an online audition listing service.  Members can also request to be emailed audition announcements automatically as they become available.

Arts Crush 
Arts Crush is a monthlong festival throughout the Puget Sound region, featuring hundreds of events in theatre, dance, literature, music and visual arts.  It is managed by Theatre Puget Sound in cooperation with a consortium of arts organizations from across Western Washington.

Bumbershoot Stage 
Since 2004, Theatre Puget Sound has run a stage at Seattle's annual Bumbershoot festival, highlighting local companies and providing an outlet for them to showcase their productions before an audience of thousands.

General auditions 
TPS holds yearly general auditions, which are attended by a large number of theatres throughout the area. Auditioners must meet one of the following conditions: (a) be members of Actors' Equity Association, (b) have attended a professional training program, (c) be a recent graduate from an undergraduate program, or (d) have at least 4 non-academic stage credits.

Gregory Awards 
The Gregory Awards are a set of honors dedicated to theatre in Western Washington State. The Gregory Awards present an opportunity for the professional theater community to come together to celebrate theatre in the region, honor the outstanding achievements of the region's theatre practitioners, and to raise the visibility of the local theatre scene as a whole.

The Gregory Awards began with a single category, the Gregory A. Falls Sustained Achievement Award, in 1998. As of 2011, the awards have grown to encompass 12 categories, 11 of which recognize outstanding contributions over the previous season.

Performance spaces 
TPS manages two performance spaces located at Seattle Center's Center House building.  The smaller of these, Theatre4, seats 75 and is also available for hourly rehearsal rental.  The larger of these, the Center House Theatre, seats 192 and is generally available only for production runs of a full day or more.  The Center House Theatre is also home to Book-It Repertory Theatre and Seattle Shakespeare Company.

Rehearsal rooms 
Theatre Puget Sound manages eight rehearsal spaces located at Seattle Center in the Center House building.  These are available for hourly rental and range in size from 663 square feet to 1043 square feet.

Workshops 
Throughout the year, Theatre Puget Sound and its partners offer workshops in various theatre-related subjects.  In the past, these have included topics such as marketing, tax preparation and auditioning.

External links
TPS Website
Arts Crush Website
Gregory Awards Website
Artist Trust Website
Northwest Source - Entertainment

Theatre companies in Washington (state)